An Everyday Story is a 1948 drama film directed by Günther Rittau and starring Gustav Fröhlich, Marianne Simson and Karl Schönböck. The film was produced in 1944, towards the end of the Second World War, but was not given a release until DEFA in the Soviet Zone distributed it four years later. It received its Austrian release the following year, and finally in West Germany in 1950.

The film's sets were designed by the art director Otto Hunte and Karl Vollbrecht.

Synopsis
A novelist completes what he considers to be his masterpiece, but the publisher tells him instead to write an everyday story.

Cast
 Gustav Fröhlich as Bernd Falkenhagen
 Marianne Simson as Anneliese Schwarz
 Karl Schönböck as Herbert Winkler
 Margot Jahnen as Susi Liebig
 Hans Brausewetter as Werner, Direktor Exzelsior-Verlag
 Paul Henckels as Spaziergänger
 Hans Leibelt as Annelieses Vater
 Käthe Haack
 Oscar Sabo as Portier Wudicke
 Gerda Danker as Sekretärin
 Armin Schweizer
 Karl Etlinger as Hausnachbar
 Hildegard Grethe as Annelieses Mutter
 Karl Ludwig Schreiber as Gast

See also
 Überläufer

References

Bibliography
 Bock, Hans-Michael & Bergfelder, Tim. The Concise Cinegraph: Encyclopaedia of German Cinema. Berghahn Books, 2009.

External links 
 

1948 films
1948 drama films
German drama films
East German films
1940s German-language films
Films directed by Günther Rittau
Films about writers
Tobis Film films
German black-and-white films
1940s German films